is a Japanese professional footballer who plays as a defensive midfielder or a centre back for J1 League club Kashiwa Reysol.

Career
Keiya Shiihashi joined J1 League club Vegalta Sendai in 2016. On April 26, 2017, he debuted in J.League Cup (v Shimizu S-Pulse).
player.

Club statistics
.

Honours
Individual
Toulon Tournament Best XI: 2019

References

External links
Profile at Kashiwa Reysol

1997 births
Living people
Association football people from Chiba Prefecture
Japanese footballers
J1 League players
Vegalta Sendai players
Kashiwa Reysol players
Association football midfielders